A' Chralaig is a mountain in the Northwest Highlands of Scotland, north of Loch Cluanie and south of Glen Affric. It is the highest peak along Glen Shiel and can be easily climbed from the Cluanie Inn on the A87. The eastern slopes of the mountain, are owned by the Forestry Commission and are part of the Kintail National Scenic Area.

Despite being the highest peak on the ridge, it is considered less interesting than the route over Stob Coire na Cràlaig to the nearby Mullach Fraoch-choire. These two peaks may be combined with the neighbouring peaks of Sgurr nan Conbhairean and Sail Chaorainn to make the so-called "Cluanie Horseshoe", although no path connects A' Chràlaig with the peaks to the east.

See also 
 List of Munro mountains
 Mountains and hills of Scotland

References

Mountains and hills of the Northwest Highlands
Munros
Marilyns of Scotland
One-thousanders of Scotland